France competed at the 2019 Winter Deaflympics held between 12 and 21 December 2019 in Province of Sondrio in Northern Italy. The country won three silver medals and two bronze medals, all in alpine skiing. The country finished in 9th place in the medal table.

Medalists

Alpine skiing 

Nicolas Sarremejane won the silver medal in the men's Super-G, men's giant slalom and men's slalom events. He also won the bronze medal in the men's alpine combined event.

Thomas Luxcey won the bronze medal in the men's Super-G event.

References 

Winter Deaflympics
Nations at the 2019 Winter Deaflympics